Hieracium submarginellum is a species of flowering plant belonging to the family Asteraceae.

Its native range is the Baltic states and northwestern European Russia.

References

submarginellum
Flora of the Baltic states
Flora of Northwest European Russia
Plants described in 1960